Crni Kao may refer to:
 Crni Kao (Batočina), a village in Batočina, Serbia
 Crni Kao (Ražanj), a village in Ražanj, Serbia